Collix multifilata is a moth in the  family Geometridae. It is found in Australia (Queensland).

Adults have grey-brown patterned wings, with a dark comma-shaped mark near the centre of the forewings. The wings have scalloped margins.

References

Moths described in 1896
multifilata